Hato Hone St John (also often referred to as St John Ambulance of New Zealand) is a charitable organisation providing healthcare services to the New Zealand public. The organisation provides ambulance services throughout New Zealand, as well as certain other health services.

History 
A branch of the St John Ambulance was first founded in Christchurch, New Zealand, on 30 April 1885. It was decided to appoint the Governor (William Jervois) as president, and the mayors of Christchurch (Charles Hulbert), Sydenham (William White), and St Albans (Benjamin Bull) as vice-presidents. Further branches quickly spread across the country providing first aid and patient transport and in 1946, due to the efforts of St John in New Zealand during the Second World War, the organisation was elevated to a full Priory, with the Governor-General of New Zealand as the Prior.

During the 1970s and 1980s much restructuring took place in response to changing social and economic conditions, moving away from the traditional militaristic structure and resulting in the current modern organisation.

Today, Hato Hone St John is a major health service provider in New Zealand. It provides 90% of the emergency and non-emergency ambulance coverage for the New Zealand population, emergency care and first aid at public events, support phone lines for the elderly and house-bound, hospital patient transport, public first aid training, health products and a youth programme.

In June 2020, Hato Hone St John announced that it would be laying off staff due to a NZ$30 million deficit caused by the economic effects of the COVID-19 pandemic in New Zealand. The organisation had failed to secure a wage subsidy from the Government despite a 40% drop in income.

Services 
Hato Hone St John services include emergency and non-emergency ambulance treatment and transport, event medical services, first aid training, the sale of first aid kits and supplies, programmes offering non-clinical support for patients and their family and friends, medical alarms, caring callers who phone to check on someone's well-being and health shuttles to help people with impaired mobility attend essential appointments.

Ambulance services 
Hato Hone St John provides ambulance services for approximately 90% of New Zealand's population. The only area where the organisation does not provide emergency ambulance services is the Greater Wellington region (specifically the areas of the Capital and Coast, Hutt Valley, and Wairarapa DHBs), where Wellington Free Ambulance is the provider.
Hato Hone St John treated or transported 469,850 patients in the year ending 30 June 2017, attending more than 389,350 emergency incidents. The 655 ambulances or operational vehicles, based at 205 stations, covered more than 18 million kilometres in the same time.

Hato Hone St John comprises:
 Emergency ambulance services (ambulance and first responders)
 Managing the PRIME (Primary Response in Medical Emergencies) programme. This project is funded by the Ministry of Health and ACC to provide both the coordinated response and appropriate management of emergencies in rural locations, using the skills of specially trained general practitioners and registered nurses
 Transporting patients for arranged hospital admissions and to hospital outpatient clinics (Health Shuttles)
 Transferring patients between hospitals or from hospital to home (Patient Transfer Service)
 Coordinating and staffing air ambulance flights and connections with the four Westpac rescue helicopter services operating in New Zealand
 Clinical education

First aid 
In addition to ambulance services, Hato Hone St John provide first aid training courses, kits and supplies, automated external defibrillators (AEDs) and first aid smart phone applications.

Hato Hone St John offers various levels of first aid training ranging from basic training courses for the general public, to courses which help businesses meet the requirements of the Health and Safety in Employment Act, to advanced resuscitation training for health professionals. Hato Hone St John also offers specialised courses such as child, sports, electrical workers, outdoor and maritime first aid training.

Hato Hone St John is registered with the New Zealand Qualifications Authority (NZQA). The organisation is also a member of the NZ Resuscitation Council (NZRC) and the Association of Emergency Care Training Providers (AECTP).

Organisations can purchase AEDs from Hato Hone St John and learn how to use them. Hato Hone St John also sells first aid kits and supplies for home or business use.

Youth programmes 
Hato Hone St John Youth programmes help young New Zealanders to develop first aid, health care, leadership and life skills. Penguins are aged 6 to 8, Cadets are aged 8 to 18. These programmes are fully funded by donations.

St John Youth has 6,337 Youth Members and 1,119 Youth Leaders as of 30 June 2017

Community programmes 
Hato Hone St John provides health shuttles, youth programmes, hospital friends, phone friends and pet outreach therapy to help people live independently, get the social connections they need and improve their wellbeing. These services are run primarily by volunteers and are often free of charge.

Health Shuttles 
The Hato Hone St John Health Shuttle is a free community service that transports people to essential medical and health-related appointments, and then brings them home again.

Caring Caller 
Caring Caller is a service that Hato Hone St John provides for people who live alone or feel a bit lonely. Volunteers phone clients regularly to check that everything is OK. This free service is fully funded by donations.

Friends of the Emergency Department/Hospital Friends 
Hato Hone St John runs hospital volunteer programmes called FEDs and Hospital Friends. Our people provide comfort and support to patients, their whanau and friends. Friends of the Emergency Department (FED) and Hospital Friends volunteers provide comfort and support to patients and their families in hospital emergency departments, as well as other departments and smaller hospitals.

ASB St John in Schools 
The ASB St John in Schools programme visits schools to give children an understanding of how to recognise, and act appropriately in, a first aid emergency The topic range includes how to call an ambulance and basic first aid. The ASB St John in Schools programme visits schools in many parts of New Zealand to give children an understanding of how to recognise, and act appropriately in, a first aid emergency. The topic range includes how to call an ambulance, basic first aid skills and familiarisation with ambulances and the people and equipment children may interact with in a first aid emergency. ASB St John in Schools caters to a broad age group – from late pre-school age through to intermediate. Topics and teaching strategies are all appropriate to the age of the children.

Partnered programmes 
Hato Hone St John partners with other organisations to provide Healthline (a free 24x7 health advice helpline), Outreach Therapy Pets and PRIME (a programme that uses the skills of specially-trained rural GPs and/or rural nurses to support the Hato Hone St John Ambulance Service during medical emergencies in remote areas).

Event medical services 
Hato Hone St John is New Zealand's number-one provider of medical services at events. They provide medical coverage at some of the largest and most high-profile events in the country but also look after small events, like school gala days and community fairs.

Hato Hone St John medical alarms 
The Hato Hone St John Medical alarm service is designed to help people live independently for longer. The alarm is a pendant which is worn around the neck or wrist. If the person has an accident or feels unwell or at risk they can press the emergency button on the alarm. Hato Hone St John immediately calls the person, speaking through a loudspeaker in the alarm's base unit. If the person does not answer, an ambulance is dispatched.

Volunteers 
Hato Hone St John is a charitable organisation which relies on its volunteer workforce to deliver health services to the New Zealand population. Volunteers outnumber paid employees by around three to one. In 2017, 9,232 people volunteered for Hato Hone St John and the organisation had 3,033 paid staff. If the Hato Hone St John volunteer contribution was valued at normal commercial rates it would equate to $30 million. St John volunteers receive specialised training and clinical education.

Funding 

Contracts with the Ministry of Health, ACC and district health boards fund just under 80% of the direct operating costs of the Hato Hone St John ambulance service.

The difference is made up from community and corporate donations, fund-raising, revenue from commercial activities (first aid kits, first aid training, medical alarms and defibrillators), as well as income from emergency ambulance part charges.

These activities also fund the delivery of non-ambulance services such as the Hato Hone St John Youth programmes, Friends of the Emergency Department, Hospital Friends, Caring Caller, Hato Hone St John Safe Kids and Outreach Therapy Pets.

ASB partnership 
In 2008, St John and ASB Bank initiated a partnership. The partnership helps to expand support for St John services and deliver programmes like CPR training on a wide scale. At the same time, the partnership gives ASB the opportunity to strengthen connections with local communities and give their employees the opportunity to get involved with community services by volunteering for St John.

The partnership was launched with ASB providing the opportunity for 1,000 school children at 10 schools to learn the lifesaving resuscitation skill CPR for free.

The Order of St John 
Hato Hone St John in New Zealand has global links to the international Order of St John. His Majesty the King is Sovereign Head of the Order and the Governor-General of New Zealand is the head or Prior of St John in New Zealand.

In 1888, in recognition of its work, Queen Victoria made the Order of St John a Royal Order of Chivalry. In New Zealand, Royal Honours continue to be awarded to members for outstanding contributions and commitment to care for their communities. These Royal Honours are an independent part of the New Zealand Honours System. Honours are conferred annually at St John Investiture services.

See also
 Service Medal of the Order of St John
 St John Youth New Zealand

References

External links 

 St John New Zealand (official website)
 St John Youth NZ (official website)
 Annual Report 2017

Medical and health organisations based in New Zealand
Ambulance services in New Zealand
1885 establishments in New Zealand
Organizations established in 1885
New Zealand
Emergency services in New Zealand